Ron Jeffries (born December 26, 1939) is one of the three founders of the Extreme Programming (XP) software development methodology circa 1996, along with Kent Beck and Ward Cunningham. He was from 1996, an XP coach on the Chrysler Comprehensive Compensation System project, which was where XP was invented. He is an author of Extreme Programming Installed, the second book published about XP.  He has also written Extreme Programming Adventures in C#. He is one of the 17 original signatories of the Agile Manifesto.

Background

A Quote

Books

Articles

References

External links
 
 

1939 births
Living people
Extreme programming
American technology writers
American computer scientists
American computer programmers
Agile software development